Kountze Park is an urban public park located at 1920 Pinkney Street in the Kountze Place neighborhood of North Omaha, Nebraska, in the United States. The Park is historically significant as the site of the Trans-Mississippi Exposition of 1898.

About
Kountze Park is bordered by 19th Street on the east and 20th Street on the west, Pinkney Street on the south and Pratt Street on the north. The park is the location of a water park, playground, basketball and tennis courts, and a pavilion. It is also home to a summer program operated by the City of Omaha Parks and Recreation Department.

History
Once on a broad, flat plain midway between the Nebraska Territory towns of Omaha and Saratoga, Kountze Park was part of a plot belonging to banker Herman Kountze.

Trans-Mississippi Exposition Site

The Grand Court of the Trans-Mississippi Exposition was located in Kountze Park in 1898. The site was soon covered with buildings, boulevards, and a beautiful lagoon almost 1/2 mile long, lit by the latest technology of the times, electrical lights.

The Greater America Exposition was held at the same location in many of the same buildings the following year. By the end of 1899, all of the buildings were demolished or removed. In the several years after the Exposition, the lagoon was filled in and the area was graded to form Kountze Park. Around the park a middle- and upper-class community grew, eventually forming a connection between Near North Omaha and Saratoga. 

A scenic pond remained at the park as a remnant of the original lagoon; it was filled with dirt in 1953.

Modern times
In 1980, while excavating for a new sewer in Kountze Park, a construction foreman uncovered several pieces of a building from the Exposition. An attempt to recover more artifacts was unsuccessful. Today there are only a few pieces of plaster from Exposition buildings that remain as tangible historical artifacts. 

In 1998 many improvements to Kountze Park were made, including new playground equipment, tree plantings and a historical marker that pays homage to the Exposition. Kountze Park has been a repeated crime location in recent years.

External links
 1920s postcard
 Historic postcards of the pond from the Nebraska Memories website.
 Picture of Nebraska State Historical Marker at Kountze Park.
  at Kountze Park.

References

Landmarks in North Omaha, Nebraska
Urban public parks
History of North Omaha, Nebraska
Site of 1899 Trans-Mississippi Exposition
Parks in Omaha, Nebraska
Kountze family
World's fair sites in the United States
1889 establishments in Nebraska
Trans-Mississippi Exposition